Trofim Fyodorovich Lomakin (2 August 1924 – 13 June 1973) was a Russian weightlifter who competed for the Soviet Union. He won a gold medal at the 1952 Summer Olympics and a silver medal at the 1960 Summer Olympics. He also won two world titles (1957 and 1958) and set five official and five unofficial world records (1953–1960), two in the press, five in the clean and jerk, and three in the total.

Life 
Lomakin was born to a miner in a remote village in Siberia and started training in weightlifting aged 18, while serving in the Soviet Army in the Far East. In 1949 he moved to Leningrad and in 1952 won his first national and European titles and an Olympic gold medal. Despite his successes in the 1950s, he developed alcoholism and for this reason was excluded from the 1956 Olympic team and later dishonorably discharged from the Soviet Army. After retiring from competitions in 1960 he could not keep any job and got involved with criminals. In the late 1960s he was arrested while trying to smuggle gold out of the Soviet Union and convicted to five years in prison. He was released after three years, but soon after that fell from a 20-meter height and died. He was heavily drunk, and it was unclear whether this was an accident or a murder.

References

External links 

 

1924 births
1973 deaths
People from Altai Krai
Sportspeople from Altai Krai
Russian male weightlifters
Soviet male weightlifters
Olympic weightlifters of the Soviet Union
Weightlifters at the 1952 Summer Olympics
Weightlifters at the 1960 Summer Olympics
Olympic gold medalists for the Soviet Union
Olympic silver medalists for the Soviet Union
Olympic medalists in weightlifting
Medalists at the 1960 Summer Olympics
Medalists at the 1952 Summer Olympics
World Weightlifting Championships medalists